The 1992 Rothmans Grand Prix was a professional snooker tournament and the second of nine WPBSA ranking events in the 1992/1993 season, preceding the UK Championship. It was held from 12 to 25 October 1992 at the Hexagon Theatre in Reading, England. The event was the eleventh edition of the Grand Prix, first held in 1982 as the 1982 Professional Players Tournament.

Stephen Hendry was the defending champion, but he lost his last 64 match against Tony Chappel. Jimmy White played Ken Doherty in the final, with the latter contesting his first ranking event final. White defeated Doherty 10–9 in the final to win his eighth ranking title. In qualifying for the event, Ronnie O'Sullivan defeated Jason Curtis 5–0 in 43 minutes 36 seconds, the fastest best-of-nine-frames match to date. The event featured a prize of £80,000 for the winner of the event.

Tournament summary 

Defending and World Champion Stephen Hendry was the number 1 seed. The remaining places were allocated to players based on the world rankings.

Main draw
Below is the main draw for the event. Players in bold denote match winners.

Final

References

1992
Grand Prix
Grand Prix (snooker)